Hans Sommer (18 May 1924 – 27 March 2004) was a Swiss racing cyclist. He rode in the 1951 Tour de France, finishing in 28th place.

References

1924 births
2004 deaths
Swiss male cyclists
Place of birth missing